St. Joseph's Seminary and College, sometimes referred to as Dunwoodie after the Dunwoodie neighborhood of Yonkers, New York in which it is located, is the major seminary of the Archdiocese of New York.  Its primary mission is to form men for the priesthood in the Catholic Church.  It educates men destined to serve within the Archdiocese and other archdioceses and dioceses both in the United States and abroad.

Once called the "West Point of Seminaries" for its thorough education and strict discipline, St. Joseph's Seminary holds a reputation as one of the more prestigious and theologically orthodox Roman Catholic seminaries in the United States. As both a college and seminary, it has been accredited both through Middle States Commission on Higher Education and the Pontifical University of St. Thomas Aquinas (Angelicum), respectively.  It can, thus, offer the degrees of Master of Divinity and S.T.B. to seminarians who have fulfilled the proper academic requirements.  Those who maintain an acceptable grade point average and fulfill other academic requirements are eligible for a Master of Arts. Attached to the seminary is an Institute for Religious Studies which prepares candidates for the diaconate and offers non-seminarians, both laity and clergy, an opportunity to earn a M.A. With the inter-diocesan collaboration from the Diocese of Brooklyn and the Diocese of Rockville Centre, the formation of laity and permanent deacons, as well as the continuing education of priests will be through the Sacred Heart Institute, located at the Seminary of the Immaculate Conception, Huntington, Long Island, New York, beginning in September 2012. The seminary also serves as the major seminary for the Community of the Franciscan Friars of the Renewal, who study alongside the diocesan seminarians, but live off campus at a friary in Yonkers.

The seminary is about 16 miles north of the Cathedral of Saint Patrick in midtown Manhattan.

History
The Archdiocese of New York had operated seminaries at Fordham (once affiliated with what is now Fordham University) staffed by diocesan and, later, Jesuit priests, and then Troy. 

In 1864 Archbishop McCloskey established St. Joseph's Provincial Seminary at Troy, New York, which trained priests for the Archdiocese until it was relocated to Dunwoodie in 1896.

In 1896, under Archbishop Michael Corrigan, the seminary was transferred to Yonkers under the charge of the Sulpicians. Originally it was staffed by Sulpicians and diocesan priests.

The Seminary hosted Pope John Paul II in 1995 and Pope Benedict XVI on April 19, 2008. They each led an afternoon prayer service and visited with the seminarians.

On April 4, 2019, the Seminary hosted the incorruptible heart relic of St. Jean Vianney, the patron saint of parish priests. The relic was venerated by more than 2,000 people while it was at the seminary.

Intellectual life
In addition to offering the degrees of M.Div., S.T.B., and M.A., the seminary, through its various chairs, hosts visiting scholars throughout the academic year. 
Seminarians are given the opportunity to take part in interreligious discussions with students of non-Catholic seminaries of the metropolitan area.
Each spring, the seminary publishes The Dunwoodie Review, successor to the early 20th century New York Review (1905-1908). Previously published at least annually and bi-annually from 1961 until 1974, the journal has been annually published since 1990 as a student-managed theological journal whose content is provided by seminary faculty members and students.

Seminary formation
The seminary's primary mission is to educate men studying for the priesthood.  In doing so, it seeks to inculcate a structured schedule of public and private prayer.  Besides four years of academic work, students are required to take part in charitable activities.  Seminarians pray together three times a day, at Morning and Evening prayers and at Mass. From Monday through Thursday the Blessed Sacrament is exposed for two hours for private adoration by the seminarians.

Each year, approved seminarians progress towards the Priesthood by receiving various ecclesiastical ministries and eventually Holy Orders.  Those in first year are instituted as Lectors and often receive Candidacy in solemn rites.  Those in the second year of study receive the official ministry of Acolyte.  The beginning of the fourth year is usually when the order of Deacon is conferred.  The bishop of a seminarian's diocese ordains him to the Priesthood at the Cathedral of that seminarian's diocese, usually after the seminarian's final semester at the seminary has been completed.  New priests are immediately assigned to serve in a parish.

Seminary functions
The seminary's main building serves many other archdiocesan functions.  The priest personnel board meets weekly. Pre-Cana conferences for those preparing for the sacrament of Matrimony are hosted monthly.  Each year around Christmas, the archdiocesan choir performs in the chapel.  On campus is one of the archdiocesan tribunals and the studio of ITV for schools. Throughout the year, both days of prayer and days of further education are scheduled for the clergy of the archdiocese.

On campus was also the St. John Neumann Seminary Residence and Hall, which in collaboration with St. John's University in Queens offered courses in philosophy equivalent to a B.A. for men studying for the priesthood. Students now attend the Diocese of Brooklyn's Cathedral Seminary House of Formation in Douglaston, Queens, New York.

Beginning in August 2012, St. Joseph's Seminary has been the major seminary for the Archdiocese of New York, the Diocese of Brooklyn and the Diocese of Rockville Centre.

Faculty

Rectors

Edward R. Dyer, S.S. 1896-1902
James F. Driscoll, S.S 1902-1909
John P. Chidwick 1909-1922
James T. McEntyre 1922-1930
Arthur J. Scanlan 1931-1940
John Michael Fearns 1940-1956
Charles O'C. Sloane 1956-1958
Francis Frederick Reh 1958-1962
Thomas A. Donnellan 1962-1964
Edwin B. Broderick 1964-1968
Edward J. Montano 1968-1973
Austin B. Vaughan 1973-1979
John J. Mescall 1979-1982
Edward M. Connors 1982-1985
Edwin F. O'Brien 1985-1989
Raymond T. Powers 1990-1994
Edwin F. O'Brien 1994-1997 - Named Archbishop of Archdiocese of Military Services
Francis J. McAree 1997-2001
Peter G. Finn 2001-2007
Gerald Thomas Walsh 2007–2012
Peter Ignatius Vaccari 2012-2019
James Massa 2020-Present

Notable faculty
Lorenzo Albacete
Sara Butler, M.S.B.T. (2001-2009)
Joseph Augustine Di Noia, O.P. (2004-2005)
Francis P. Duffy
Benedict Groeschel, C.F.R.
J. M. Lelen
William Bartley Smith (1971-2009)

Notable alumni

Charles John Brown — Archbishop, Papal Nuncio to the Philippines (2020–present)
Terence Cooke — Cardinal (from 1969), Archbishop of New York (1968-1983)
Stan Fortuna — priest of the Community of Franciscan Friars of the Renewal, musician
Philip Joseph Furlong — Auxiliary Bishop of the United States Military Vicariate (1956-1971)
William Lombardy — World Junior Chess Champion (1957), tutor to World Chess Champion Bobby Fischer, priest (1967-1980)
Henry J. Mansell — Archbishop of Hartford, Connecticut (2003-2013)
Theodore Edgar McCarrick — Cardinal (2001-2018), Archbishop of Washington (2001-2006)
Timothy A. McDonnell — Bishop of Springfield, Massachusetts (2004-2014)
James Francis McIntyre — Cardinal (from 1953), Archbishop of Los Angeles (1948-1970)
John P. Meier — priest of New York, professor of Scripture at the University of Notre Dame
John Joseph Mitty — Archbishop of San Francisco (1935-1961)
Patrick Aloysius O'Boyle — Cardinal (from 1967), Archbishop of Washington (1947-1973)
Edwin Frederick O'Brien — Cardinal (from 2012), Archbishop of Baltimore (2007–2011)
Frank Pavone — priest, Director of Priests for Life, founder of Missionaries of the Gospel of Life
Dennis Joseph Sullivan — Bishop of the Diocese of Camden, New Jersey (2013–present)
David Tracy — Catholic theologian, University of Chicago Divinity School professor (1969-2008)
Michael Voris — layman, founder of RealCatholicTV and Church Militant.

Notes

Sources
 Shelley, Thomas J. Dunwoodie. Christian Classics Inc.: Westminster, Maryland, 1993.

External links

The Dunwoodie Review (St. Joseph's Seminary Theological Journal) official website

Roman Catholic Archdiocese of New York
Catholic seminaries in the United States
Universities and colleges in Westchester County, New York
Education in Yonkers, New York
Educational institutions established in 1896
Schickel & Ditmars buildings
1896 establishments in New York (state)